The 1999 Tashkent Open doubles was the doubles event of the first edition of the Tashkent Open; a WTA Tier IV tournament and the most prestigious women's tennis tournament held in Central Asia.

Evgenia Kulikovskaya and Patricia Wartusch won in the final, 7–6(7–3), 6–0, against the Spanish team of Eva Bes and Gisela Riera.

Seeds

Draw

Qualifying

Seeds

Qualifiers
 ''' Ekaterina Paniouchkina /  Anastasia Rodionova

Qualifying draw

External links
 1999 Tashkent Open Draw

1999 Tashkent Open
Tashkent Open
1999 in Uzbekistani sport